Rampurwadi is a village in Rahata taluka of Ahmednagar district in Indian state of Maharashtra.

Demographics
As per 2011 census, population of Rampurwadi is 3100 of which 1624 are males and 1476 are females.

See also
List of villages in Rahata taluka

References 

Villages in Ahmednagar district